The Lucan Irish are a Junior ice hockey team based in Lucan Biddulph, Ontario.  They play in the Provincial Junior Hockey League of the Ontario Hockey Association.

History
The Irish were founded in 1968 as the Lucan Irish Six, named after the Black Donnellys.

In 1982, the Irish won the Western Ontario Junior D Hockey League's championship.  They went on to defeat the Langton Thunderbirds of the Southern Counties Junior D Hockey League 4-games-to-1 to win the OHA Cup as provincial champions.

In 1987, the Irish again won the Western Junior D's playoff title.  They defeated the Tavistock Braves of the Southern Counties Junior D league 4-games-to-3 to win the OHA Cup for the second time as provincial champions.

In 1988, all remaining Junior D leagues were consolidated into the Western Junior league.  In 1991, the league dropped the Junior D label and became the OHA Junior Development League.  Starting in 1988, the Irish set out to prove they were the "cream of the crop" in this new league.  After the 1988-89 season, the Irish made it all the way to the league finals, but were thwarted by the Lambeth Lancers.  In 1990, 1991, and 1992, the same scenario repeated over and over again.  The Irish would finish highly ranked in their league, would make it all the way to the finals and three years in a row they would meet the Thamesford Trojans who beat them each time.

In 1999, after finishing second overall in the league standings the Irish fought all the way back to the league final.  The Irish defeated the Wellesley Applejacks 4-games-to-3 to win their third ever OHA Cup.

In 2006, the Irish twelfth overall in the OHAJDL standings.  As low seed in the standings, the Irish were figured to lose out in the early rounds of the league playoffs.  They entered the conference quarter-final against the Exeter Hawks and walked right through them with a 4-game-sweep.  The conference semi-final had the same result against the North Middlesex Stars.  The conference final was against their rivals, the Thamesford Trojans, whom they defeated in five games to enter into the league finals for the first time in seven seasons.  In the final, they met the Delhi Travellers.  A tight series, the Irish were not to be denied as the defeated the Travellers 4-games-to-2 to win their fourth OHA Cup.

After the 2006-07 season, the OHAJDL was disbanded and the Southern Ontario Junior Hockey League was formed.  In the 2006-07 season , they finished seventh overall in the league.  In the league's conference quarter-finals, the Irish met their match in the Thamesford Trojans who defeated them 4-games-to-1.

Season-by-season standings

Playoffs
1982 Won league, Won OHA championship
Lucan Irish defeated Langton Thunderbirds 4-games-to-1 in OHA championship
1987 Won league, Won OHA championship
Lucan Irish defeated Tavistock Braves 4-games-to-3 in OHA championship
1989 Lost final
Lambeth Lancers defeated Lucan Irish 4-games-to-1 in final
1990 Lost final
Thamesford Trojans defeated Lucan Irish 4-games-to-2 in final
1991 Lost final
Thamesford Trojans defeated Lucan Irish 4-games-to-1 in final
1992 Lost final
Thamesford Trojans defeated Lucan Irish 4-games-to-0 in final
1999 Won League
Lucan Irish defeated Wellesley Applejacks 4-games-to-3 in final
2006 Won League
Lucan Irish defeated Exeter Hawks 4-games-to-none in conf. quarter-final
Lucan Irish defeated North Middlesex Stars 4-games-to-none in conf. semi-final
Lucan Irish defeated Thamesford Trojans 4-games-to-1 in conf. final
Lucan Irish defeated Delhi Travellers 4-games-to-2 in final
2007 Lost Conference quarter-final
Thamesford Trojans defeated Lucan Irish 4-games-to-1 in conf. quarter-final
2008 Lost Conference quarter-final
Thamesford Trojans defeated Lucan Irish 4-games-to-3 in conf. quarter-final

Notable alumni
Matt Read
Owen Van Hooydonk

External links
Irish Homepage

Southern Ontario Junior Hockey League teams
Ice hockey teams in Ontario